Sarah Gambito is an American poet and professor. She is the author of three collections of poetry, Loves You (Persea Books, 2019), Delivered (Persea Books, 2009), and Matadora (Alice James Books, 2004). Her first collection, Matadora (Alice James Books, 2004), was a New England/New York Award winner and won the 2005 Global Filipino Literary Award for Poetry.

Career 
Gambito earned her B.A. from the University of Virginia and her M.F.A. from Brown University.

She is an assistant professor of English and director of creative writing at Fordham University. She is also co-founder, with Joseph Legaspi, of Kundiman (nonprofit organization), which serves emerging Asian American poets, and she lives in New York City.

Gambito's poems have been published in literary journals and magazines including The Iowa Review, The Antioch Review, The New Republic, Quarterly West, Fence, and in anthologies including From the Fishouse (Persea Books, 2009).

Awards 
Gambito's honors include a Barnes & Noble Writers for Writers Award from Poets & Writers, and grants and fellowships from the New York Foundation for the Arts, Urban Artists Initiative, and a MacDowell Colony Fellowship.

Works
 Matadora, Alice James Books, 2004 
 Delivered: Poems, Persea, 2009 
 Loves You: Poems, Persea, 2019,

References

External links 
 Audio: Sarah Gambito Reading for From the Fishouse
 Audio: WNYC 93.9 Radio > Sarah Gambito: Poet, Mentor and Teacher: Hear her read her poems > WNYC News > NEW York, NY April 1, 2008
 Author Page: Sarah Gambito > Persea Books
 Author Page: Sarah Gambito > Alice James Books
 Faculty Bio: Fordham University English Department Faculty > Sarah Gambito
 Kundiman Website

Living people
Poets from New York (state)
Brown University alumni
University of Virginia alumni
Fordham University faculty
American women poets
Year of birth missing (living people)
American women academics
21st-century American women